The Cabinet of Lucas Papademos succeeded the cabinet of George Papandreou, as an interim three-party coalition cabinet, leading a coalition government formed by the Panhellenic Socialist Movement (PASOK) party, New Democracy party and Popular Orthodox Rally party, after Papandreou's decision to step down, and allow a provisional coalition government to form with the task to take Greece out of a major political crisis caused by the country's debt crisis. It was the first coalition cabinet in Greece since the 1989–1990 Ecumenical Cabinet of Xenophon Zolotas.

The Prime Minister Lucas Papademos and the Cabinet were formally sworn in on 11 November 2011.

Government formation process

On November 6, Prime Minister George Papandreou met with opposition leaders to try to reach an agreement on the formation of an interim government, after a narrow confidence vote win in parliament. 
A day earlier, the leader of the opposition New Democracy party Antonis Samaras had rejected the proposal and called for an immediate election. 
After Papandreou agreed to step aside, however, the two leaders announced their intention to form a national unity government that would allow the EU bailout to proceed and pave the way for elections on 19 February 2012. 
The Communist Party and the Coalition of the Radical Left Party, refused Papandreou's invitation to join talks on a new unity government.
After several days of intense negotiations, the two major parties along with the Popular Orthodox Rally agreed to form a grand coalition headed by former European Central Bank vice-president Lucas Papademos.

On November 10, George Papandreou formally resigned as Prime Minister of Greece, and the new coalition cabinet and Prime Minister Lucas Papademos were formally sworn in on 11 November 2011.

The national unity government's main task was to allow the EU bailout to proceed and to pave the way for elections on 19 February 2012. Papademos, who was not an elected MP, has said his priority will be to keep Greece in the eurozone.

The Cabinet
In total, 48 people including the prime minister make up the government, seven more than its immediate predecessor. There are 12 new ministers in its ranks, of which nine have been sworn into government office for the first time, including the new premier.
Broadly, most Cabinet members served in the previous government of George Papandreou. Nevertheless, the new coalition government also includes six members hailing from the main opposition New Democracy party.

On 10 February 2012, the Popular Orthodox Rally withdrew from the coalition government after refusing to support the latest austerity deal. The party's only cabinet minister, Makis Voridis, was expelled by Georgios Karatzaferis for supporting the package but retained his portfolio after consultations with the prime minister. A few days later, he joined New Democracy and surrendered his parliamentary seat to LAOS.

A minor cabinet reshuffle was announced in March 2012, after Christos Papoutsis resigned as Minister for Citizen Protection in order to pursue the PASOK leadership. He was replaced by Michalis Chrisochoidis, who was succeeded as development minister by Anna Diamantopoulou. She was replaced in the education portfolio by Georgios Babiniotis, a professor of linguistics and former rector of the University of Athens.

See also
Cabinet of Greece
List of cabinets of Greece

References
General

Specific

Papademos
2011 in Greek politics
2012 in Greek politics
Cabinets established in 2011
Cabinets disestablished in 2012
2011 establishments in Greece
2012 disestablishments in Greece
Papademos
Greek government-debt crisis
New Democracy (Greece)
PASOK